is a 2001 stage play written for the Gekidan Shinkansen theater troupe by Kazuki Nakashima and directed by Hidenori Inōe, with a novelization released in August of the same year. A manga adaptation illustrated by Una Hamana was serialized in Kodansha's seinen manga magazine Monthly Afternoon from February 2007 to July 2009, with its chapters collected in three tankōbon volumes. A twenty-six episode anime television series by Madhouse was broadcast in Japan from April to September 2007. It is a comedic story often breaking the fourth wall, that involves a fireworks maker in medieval Edo and his efforts to build a rocket to carry an alien back to her people on the moon. The anime series was licensed in North America by Funimation.

Plot
The story is set in Edo in 1842, the thirteenth year of the Tenpō era. Government reforms have banned all luxuries, including plays, performances, inventions, and fireworks. Despite the political climate, Seikichi, a young fireworks maker, dreams of making a huge firework the likes of which have never been seen. But every time he fires a test rocket, he finds himself pursued by government officials.

One night, a blue monster and a white monster are fighting in the woods, battling each other and battling a group of human warriors. The blue monster gains the upper hand but is distracted by Seikichi's rocket, which allows the white monster to escape. The next day a mysterious girl appears before Seikichi and asks him to make a firework that will reach the moon.

Throughout the series, the characters use terms and items that have not been created yet, including a pocket calculator and television sets. The TVs are primarily used as flashback devices to bring characters up to date on events they missed. Additionally, backgrounds in the series show shops with signs advertising electronics, specifically TVs and DVDs. In episode 12, Onui and Shunpei repeatedly pass back and forth between 1842 Edo and a modern Japanese railway station, even riding the train in one scene, without taking any notice of the change. There are other times when the characters acknowledge the fact that they are in an anime and comment on anachronistic language used.

Characters

Residents of Furai Row-House Block

A pyrotechnician who dreams of making gigantic fireworks no one has ever seen or launched before, Seikichi is very hot-tempered and will get flustered easily. He was home schooled by his parents, who were most likely pyrotechnicians too.

A strange but beautiful girl who appears unexpectedly in Seikichi's home, Sora asks Seikichi to make a rocket that will reach the moon. She is also the white sky beast, a fact which she keeps from all but a select few of her new friends. Unlike the blue sky beast, Sora can speak to humans while in her true form. She does this several times when alone with Ginjiro.

A mathematical genius and Seikichi's younger brother, Shunpei, is much like his brother in personality, but was not home schooled like him. Despite the time period, he often uses a calculator to solve his problems.

A locksmith who can break any lock with his fingers, Ginjiro is also Captain of the Men in Black, code-named "Captain Bellybutton", but prefers not to be called that.

The carpenter of the row house, Santa is usually seen with Rokubei and Shinza.

The tile mason of the row house, Rokubei is known for his grumpy and violent attitude, as well as for his enormous teeth that take up half his face. Usually seen with Santa and Shinza.

The wife of Rokubei, yet her name is never mentioned. She constantly smacks her husband to shut him up and apologizes for his actions.

The engineer of the row house who frequents Akihabara. Usually seen with Santa and Rokubei.

Tenho is a circus performer who specializes in sleight-of-hand.

Tenho's exceedingly tall brother, Tenten assists Tenho as a circus performer as well.

The unnoticeable cross-dressing scale-maker, Genzo is extremely depressed by the fact that nobody except his mother and Onui recognizes him. He is also a mathematical genius, shown providing solutions to problems posted publicly by Shunpei. Later in the series, he is turned into a dove by one of the old man's contraptions.

An upbeat, cheery middle-aged woman who constantly tries to cheer up her son.

The town-belle watchdog for public morality at the row house, Onui acts like a puppy, often sniffing people. She also styles her hair so it looks like the tips of a dog's tail and wears hairpins which resemble large eyes. In Episode 12, she is revealed to be Shupei's childhood pet he used to play with, but she left him because he wanted to solve a complicated math problem.

A mysterious fellow, known as the landlord of the row house. He is always surrounded by a coterie of young women, and has many strange inventions inside his home. At one point, the row house is heavily damaged by a gigantic wood-and-ceramic mecha, and the old man repairs it by pulling a lever on his wheelchair, which causes the damaged buildings to retract into the ground and be replaced by new, undamaged ones. In Episode 10, he is identified as a historical figure named Gennai Hiraga.

Outside the Row-House

Wealthy owner of the Shirahama-ya pawn shop, and an old friend of Ginjiro from Osaka.

Daughter of the owner of the Kagiya fireworks shop, and a childhood friend of Seikichi.

A crazy rocketeer who lives deep inside the Chichibu mountains with tanukis as friends, Tetsuju thinks he can speak the moon people language (which is gibberish) and Sora usually responds to him.
 / 

A pale, slim, white-haired woman who wears a dark-blue kimono. She is also the Blue Sky Beast. She has to consume the vital fluids of higher beings, i.e., drink the blood of humans. She cozies up to Akai, persuading him to find and kill people for her to feed on. After a conversation with Genzo's mother, she realizes she does not know her name, or even whether or not she has one. Shortly before her death, Akai gives her the name Yu.

The Government

A low-ranking policeman under the South Edo Magistrate who hates the residents of the row house, Akai has an obsessive compulsive disorder and feels the need to clean up dirt and trash from the street.

Secret agents under the South Edo Magistrate, they tend to constantly move in odd ways such as scuttling like insects or cartwheeling. Their code names are taken from the body parts in which their powers are concentrated.

Yozo is the South Edo Magistrate who dubbed Ginjiro the captain of the Men in Black. He is based on a historical figure.

The North Edo Magistrate who hired Tenho and Tenten to spy on the old man due to suspicion, and he also hangs out in town in disguise as Kin the Playboy. He is based on a historical figure.

The Senior Councilor of the Shogun Government, the man who banned fireworks and all forms of entertainment in town. He is based on a historical figure.

Media

Stage play
A novelization of the stage play was published by Ronsosha on August 7, 2001.

Manga
A manga adaptation illustrated by Una Hamana was serialized in Kodansha's seinen manga magazine Monthly Afternoon from February 25, 2007, to July 25, 2009. Kodansha collected its chapters in three tankōbon volumes, released from October 23, 2007, to October 23, 2009.

Anime
A twenty-six episode anime television series was animated by Madhouse. The series was broadcast on TV Saitama, Tokyo MX, Chiba TV, RKB, HBC, TV Aichi and MBS from April 4 to September 26, 2007. The opening of the series is "Oh Edo Nagareboshi IV" by Puffy, which was also used as the ending theme for episodes 1 and 26.

The series was licensed in North America by Funimation in 2008. The series debuted on Funimation Channel on November 15, 2010. Crunchyroll added the series to their catalogue in November 2017.

Episode list

Reception

Writing for the Los Angeles Times, Charles Solomon ranked the series the fifth best anime on his "Top 10".

References

 "Oh!-Edo Rocket". (January 2007) Newtype USA p. 11.

External links
 
 

2001 Japanese novels
Alternate history anime and manga
Films with screenplays by Shō Aikawa
Funimation
Kodansha manga
Madhouse (company)
Science fiction anime and manga
Seinen manga
Surreal comedy anime and manga